Nilberto da Silva Melo (born 18 November 1973) is a Brazilian retired footballer who last played as a midfielder for F.C. Motagua.

Club career
He and his brother Edmilson, came to Honduras to C.D. Marathón and after two season they left to Motagua because they didn't fit into Manuel Keosseian's tactics.

Personal life
He has four football playing brothers: former Flamengo midfielder Nélio, Cruzeiro- and Brazilian World Cup defender Gilberto, former El Salvador international Nildeson and Edmilson with whom he played in Honduras.

References

External links
 CONMEBOL.com - Motagua squad Copa Sudamericana 2008
 
 CBF 

1973 births
Living people
Footballers from Rio de Janeiro (city)
Association football midfielders
Brazilian footballers
Brazilian expatriate footballers
C.D. Marathón players
F.C. Motagua players
Liga Nacional de Fútbol Profesional de Honduras players
Expatriate footballers in Honduras
Brazilian expatriate sportspeople in Honduras